Magomed Asadaliyevich Gimbatov (born November 11, 1990) is a Russian professional ice hockey player. He is currently playing with SKA-Neva of the Supreme Hockey League (VHL).

Gimbatov made his Kontinental Hockey League debut playing with Metallurg Novokuznetsk during the inaugural 2008–09 KHL season.

References

External links

1990 births
Living people
HC Almaty players
Buran Voronezh players
Lokomotiv Yaroslavl players
Metallurg Novokuznetsk players
Russian ice hockey forwards
San Francisco Bulls players
SKA Saint Petersburg players
SKA-Neva players
HC Vityaz players